Glen Benton (born June 18, 1967) is an American death metal musician. He is best known as the lead vocalist and bassist for the death metal band Deicide and was also a part of the band Vital Remains, where he has performed in recording sessions as well as live with them on a few occasions. He is known for very low guttural growls as well as very high shrieks.

Biography 
Benton was born in Niagara Falls, New York but was raised in Tampa, Florida. It was here on July 21, 1987, after guitarist Brian Hoffman replied to Benton's advertisement in a local music magazine, Deicide was formed. Within days the band, consisting of Benton (bass/vocals), Hoffman, Hoffman's brother Eric (guitars) and Steve Asheim (drums), was named "Amon", after the Egyptian deity. Within a month, Amon had recorded the crude Feasting the Beast 8-track demo in Benton's garage and had started playing the occasional gig in the Tampa area. In 1989, Amon recorded their second demo, Sacrificial, at Morrisound with producer Scott Burns. Benton also collaborated with the Mexican metal band Transmetal on their album El Infierno de Dante with the choruses, under the production of Scott Burns in Morrisound, which sold almost 100,000 copies.

In May 2015 Benton was endorsed by ESP guitars, and has been using a custom-made EX bass with a reverse headstock and EMG pick-ups since then. He has also used Phoenix and Stream bass models.

Satanism
Benton is known for his Satanist and anti-Christian beliefs, and views of "today's corrupt religious systems". He is renowned for an inverted cross he has repeatedly branded into his forehead over the years. According to Steve Asheim, this act was likely in response to previous press attention the band received when Brian Hoffman burned an inverted cross into his arm with a cigarette.

Despite having claimed in an interview he shares a "spiritual link" with Lucifer, who tells him "what to say and what to write about," the nature of Benton's 'Satanism' is obscure and a subject of controversy, particularly due to allegations by former Deicide guitarist Eric Hoffman, who dismissed it as insincere and spurious. In early years, Benton was ostensibly a theistic satanist; he implied he had held the belief of the Christian God but worshipped Satan instead. Thus, his beliefs have been questioned by followers of Anton LaVey's Church of Satan, which Benton has blasted on the grounds it is an organized religion, promoting what he perceives to be "Hollywood Satanism".

Arguably, Benton's claims have always been tongue-in-cheek as his purported "Satanism" has since largely been defined as vehement anti-Christian atheism complemented with theatrics suitable for the band. In the July 2008 issue of Revolver Magazine, Benton stated there was no ideological agenda in Deicide and the music was first and foremost.

Controversy

"Sacrificial Suicide" 
The self-titled 1990 debut album of his group Deicide featured a song entitled "Sacrificial Suicide", in which Benton was alleged to have claimed that in order to achieve a life opposite that of Jesus he planned to commit suicide at age 33. This claim that he would commit suicide at the age of 33 continued throughout the 1990s. However, he passed that age in 2000 and did not commit suicide. In 2006, he stated that these statements had been "asinine remarks" and that "only cowards and losers" choose to kill themselves.

Religious beliefs 
In the early-to-mid-1990s, Benton was a frequent opponent guest to Christian radio shows, such as Bob Larson's "Talk Back" show. Though a serious discussion rarely took place on the program, the exchanges between the two mainly consisted of taunts from Benton and tongue-in-cheek teasing. Larson continually invited Benton to his talk show, but Benton often declined.

Animal sacrifice allegations 
In 1992, newspapers reported that Benton had expressed an interest in, and participated in, the slaughter of live rodents such as rats and squirrels. During an interview with NME Magazine, Benton shot a squirrel with a pellet gun: Benton explained it was to prevent any further damage to his electrical system and other contents in the attic of his home where the interview was held. The publicity led to an attempted bomb attack on Benton during Deicide's Legion tour at the International 2 in Manchester, England, by an animal rights organization. Benton was also beaten up in Bradford. A similar attack was attempted at a previous show in Stockholm, where a supposed small fire bomb was set to detonate during Deicide's set. No one was injured, but the bomb damaged the venue. The bomb was reported to be an M-80. The tour was curtailed.

Personal life 
Benton has an interest in motorcycles, which can be seen in the music videos for the Deicide songs "Scars of the Crucifix" and "Conviction." He also has two sons, Daemon Michael Benton and Vinnie Benton. Although Deicide is a death metal band, Benton prefers not to use the "death metal" terminology.

Discography 

With Deicide
 As Amon; Feasting the Beast demo (1987)
 As Amon; Sacrificial demo (1989)
 Deicide (1990)
 Legion (1992)
 Amon: Feasting the Beast compilation (1993)
 Once Upon the Cross (1995)
 Serpents of the Light (1997)
 When Satan Lives live album (1998)
 Insineratehymn (2000)
 In Torment in Hell (2001)
 The Best of Deicide compilation (2003)
 Scars of the Crucifix (2004)
 When London Burns DVD (2006)
 The Stench of Redemption (2006)
 Doomsday L.A. live EP/DVD (2007)
 Till Death Do Us Part (2008)
 To Hell with God (2011)
 In the Minds of Evil (2013)
 Overtures of Blasphemy (2018)

With Vital Remains
 Dechristianize (2003)
 Icons of Evil (2007)

Guest appearances
 Cannibal Corpse, Eaten Back to Life (1990); backing vocals on "Mangled" and "A Skull Full of Maggots"
 Napalm Death, Harmony Corruption (1990); backing vocals on "Unfit Earth"
 Cancer, Death Shall Rise (1991); backing vocals on "Hung, Drawn and Quartered"
 Cannibal Corpse, Butchered at Birth (1991); backing vocals on "Vomit the Soul"
 Transmetal, Dante's Inferno (1993); backing vocals on "Dante's Inferno" and "Hymn for Him"
 Roadrunner United (2005); vocals on "Annihilation by the Hands of God"
 Roadrunner United Live Concert DVD (2008); vocals on Obituary's "The End Complete" and Deicide's "Dead By Dawn".
 Belphegor, Conjuring the Dead (2014); additional vocals on "Legions of Destruction"

References

External links 
 Deicide (official site)
 Deicide: sons of Satan, The Metal Forge, 2006-10-16

1967 births
American heavy metal bass guitarists
American male bass guitarists
American heavy metal singers
American Theistic Satanists
Anti-Christian sentiment in the United States
Critics of Christianity
Death metal musicians
Living people
Musicians from Tampa, Florida
Obscenity controversies in music
20th-century American guitarists
Deicide (band) members
Musicians from Niagara Falls, New York
American people of Italian descent
20th-century American male singers
20th-century American singers